Countess Magdalena Elisabeth of Hanau-Münzenberg (28 March 1611 – 26 February 1687) was a German noblewoman.  She was a daughter of Count Albert of Hanau-Münzenberg-Schwarzenfels (1579-1635) and his wife, Countess Ehrengard of Isenburg (1577-1637).

Life 
On 28 March 1636, she married the Imperial Cupbearer, George Frederick Schenk of Limpurg-Speckfeld (27 June 1596 – 5 December 1651).  He was a son of Eberhard Schenk of Limpurg-Speckfeld (1560-1622) and Countess Catherine of Hanau-Lichtenberg.  During the Thirty Years' War, George Frederick served in the armies of Ernst von Mansfeld and King Gustavus Adolphus of Sweden.

Magdalena Elisabeth and George Frederick had at least three children:
 Francis (1637-1673)
 Vollrat (1641-1713), the last member of the Limpurg-Speckfeld line
 George Eberhard (1643-1705)

Ancestors

References 
 Reinhard Dietrich: Die Landesverfassung in dem Hanauischen, in the series Hanauer Geschichtsblätter, vol. 34, Hanau, 1996, 
 Reinhard Suchier: Genealogie des Hanauer Grafenhauses, in: Festschrift des Hanauer Geschichtsvereins zu seiner fünfzigjährigen Jubelfeier am 27. August 1894, Hanau, 1894
 Gerd Wunder, Max Schefold, and Herta Beutter: Die Schenken von Limpurg und ihr Land, in the series Forschungen aus Württembergisch Franken, vol. 20, Sigmaringen, 1982
 Ernst J. Zimmermann: Hanau Stadt und Land, 3rd ed., Hanau, 1919, reprinted 1978

Footnotes 

House of Hanau
1611 births
1687 deaths
17th-century German people